"Our Town" is a 1955 episode of the American anthology series Producers' Showcase directed by Delbert Mann and starring Frank Sinatra, Paul Newman and Eva Marie Saint. Sinatra plays the stage manager and Paul Newman and Eva Marie Saint portray the teenagers who fall in love and get married. The episode is a musical adaptation of Thornton Wilder's 1938 play Our Town, with songs by Jimmy van Heusen and Sammy Cahn, mostly sung by Sinatra the stage manager between and during scenes from the play, and including a duet with Paul Newman and Eva Marie Saint.  The 90-minute show was Sinatra's only performance in a dramatic role specifically for television until Contract on Cherry Street in 1977.

Production
Frank Sinatra wears a suit and tie during the live broadcast, and intermittently dons a cocked fedora during the show. This is the only time Paul Newman and Sinatra headlined together in a narrative production. Newman and Eva Marie Saint would subsequently lead the cast of Exodus together in 1960.

All episodes of Producers' Showcase were broadcast in full color although only black and white kinescopes remain for most of the shows, including "Our Town" as well as a 90-minute version of '"The Petrified Forest" starring Humphrey Bogart, Henry Fonda and Lauren Bacall.

Reception
The show was praised by television critics, although several writers have questioned Sinatra's suitability for the role of the Stage Manager. Thornton Wilder reportedly disliked the production.

Cast 
Frank Sinatra as Stage Manager
Paul Newman as George Gibbs
Eva Marie Saint as Emily Webb
Shelley Fabares as Rebecca Gibbs
Sylvia Field as Mrs. Gibbs
Paul Hartman as Mr. Webb
Peg Hillias as Mrs. Webb
Harvey B. Dunn
Charlotte Knight
David Saber
Ernest Truex as Dr. Gibbs
Carol Veazie as Mrs. Soames
Anthony Sydes

Soundtrack 
This television production marked the beginning of the lengthy and successful collaboration between Cahn and Van Heusen.  Among their songs for the production was "Love and Marriage", later known as the theme song to the TV show Married... with Children. Sinatra's version of the song from the program became a chart success, as did another version quickly recorded by Dinah Shore.  The show was also Nelson Riddle's first time to take charge as conductor of an entire television production.

References

External links

1955 American television episodes
Television anthology episodes
Musical television episodes
Television episodes directed by Delbert Mann